Valeriy Zuyev (November 5, 1952 – 6 May 2016) was a Ukrainian football player and coach.

Honours
 Soviet Top League winner: 1974, 1975, 1977, 1983.
 Soviet Cup winner: 1974, 1978, 1981.
 UEFA Cup Winners' Cup winner: 1975.
 UEFA Super Cup winner: 1975.

International career
Zuyev played his only game for USSR on November 23, 1975 in a UEFA Euro 1976 qualifier against Turkey.

Death
Valeriy Zuyev died on 6 May 2016, after a long illness.

References

External links
  Profile

1952 births
2016 deaths
Soviet footballers
Soviet Union international footballers
Soviet Top League players
FC Dynamo Kyiv players
FC SKA Rostov-on-Don players
FC Arsenal Kyiv players
FC Dnipro players
Ukrainian football managers
Footballers from Kyiv
FC Dynamo-2 Kyiv managers
Association football defenders